"Decebal" National College (Colegiul Naţional "Decebal") is a high school in Deva, Romania.

Alumni 
Adrian Sitaru (1990)

Educational institutions established in 1871
Schools in Hunedoara County
1871 establishments in Austria-Hungary
Deva, Romania
National Colleges in Romania